Polkas for a Gloomy World is an album by the American polka band Brave Combo, released in 1995. The band intended for it to be a return to their traditional polka fusion roots.

The album was nominated for a Grammy Award, in the "Best Polka Album" category.

Production
The album was produced by Brave Combo. The songs are sung in English, as well as in Spanish, German, Russian, and Polish. "Flying Saucer" was inspired by frontman Carl Finch's observation of bizarre illuminations over Marfa, Texas; the standard "In Heaven, There Is No Beer" contains additional, original lyrics.

Critical reception

The Washington Post wrote that the album "proves the polka can be every bit as invigorating as a Cajun two-step, another dance music rescued from wedding-reception hell." The Chicago Tribune stated that Brave Combo "plays Polish polkas and waltzes, German polkas, Czech drinking songs and conjunto and tejano tunes, or 'Mexican polkas' ... With the exception of the waltzes, the music careens at breakneck speed."

The Sunday News determined that the album breaks down "snob barriers with a feel-good feast for the ears and feet." The Omaha World-Herald deemed it "a tasty mix of polka, country and blues—all with a hard-rock attitude." The Post-Tribune concluded that Polkas for a Gloomy World is "upbeat and silly—but really, you only need one Brave Combo album in your collection for novelty's sake." The Columbus Dispatch labeled it "a typical exotic mix of polka, norteno and tejano music"; the paper later named it one of the best albums of the year.

AllMusic called the album "a collection that finds the meeting place between Eastern Europe and the Tejano brand of accordion demolition music."

Track listing

References

Brave Combo albums
1995 albums
Rounder Records albums